The United Nations has defined seven sub-regions in Afghanistan for their assistance planning, which are grouped in three regions:

Northern Afghanistan

North Eastern Afghanistan

Badakhshan
Baghlan
Kunduz
Takhar

North Western Afghanistan

Balkh
Faryab
Jowzjan
Samangan
Sar-e Pol

Central Afghanistan

Eastern Afghanistan
Kunar
Laghman
Nangarhar
Nuristan

Central Afghanistan

Kabul
Kapisa
Logar
Panjshir
Parwan
Wardak

Western Afghanistan

Badghis
Bamyan
Farah
Ghor
Herat

Southern Afghanistan

South Eastern Afghanistan

Ghazni
Khost
Paktia
Paktika

South Western Afghanistan

Daykundi
Helmand
Kandahar
Nimruz
Uruzgan
Zabul

Afghanistan and the United Nations
Regions of Afghanistan
United Nations operations in Asia